Elliott (or Elliot) was launched at Liverpool in 1783. She made ten voyages as a slave ship, carrying slaves from West Africa to the West Indies. Next, she made one voyage as a whaler. She then became a merchantman, sailing between England and South America. In November 1807 French privateers captured her.

Slave ship
Elliott first appears in Lloyd's Register in 1783 with "Clemensn", master, F. Ingram, owner, and trade Liverpool–Africa.

First slave voyage (1783-1785): Captain John Cleminson sailed from Liverpool on 17 September 1783, bound for the Bight of Benin. He purchased his slaves at Whydah and arrived at Kingston, Jamaica, on 27 August 1784. He had embarked an estimated 797 slaves and he actually landed 730, for an estimated loss rate of 8.4%. She left Jamaica on 1 November 1784 and arrived at Liverpool on 11 January 1785. Elliott had left Liverpool with a crew of 57 men and had suffered 22 crew deaths.

Second slave voyage (1785-1786): Cleminson sailed Elliott from Liverpool on 29 June 1785 for the Bight of Benin with a crew of 66. He purchased slaves primarily at Lagos/Onim, and also at Anomabu and elsewhere in the region before arriving at Kingston on 29 March 1786 with 898 slaves. He had embarked an estimated 980 slaves and he landed 897, for an estimated loss rate of 8.4%.  She left Kingston on 2 June and arrived back at Liverpool on 26 July.

Third slave voyage (1786-1788): Elliott had three masters on her third slaving voyage — John Reid, William Smith, and James Mathias. She sailed from Liverpool on 20 September 1786, bound for the Bight of Benin. She purchased her slaves at Whydah, Lagos/Onim, and elsewhere in the region, and arrived at Kingston on 18 January 1788 with 520. She landed 373. She left Kingston on 15 April, and arrived back at Liverpool on 25 June. She had started with a crew of 59 men, and had 30 crew deaths on the voyage.

Missing information (1788-1792): Elliott appears in Lloyd's Register for 1789 with Reed, master, F. Ingram, owner, and trade Liverpool–Africa. There is no record of a slave trading voyage for Elliott during this period, though apparently William Clarkson became her master on 12 May 1791. She left Lloyd's Register in 1791, returning in the issue for 1792 with Sherwood, master, Dawkins, owner, and trade again Liverpool–Africa.

Fourth slave voyage (1792-1793): Captain William Sherwood sailed from Liverpool 8 August 1792, bound for West Central Africa and St. Helena. He started purchasing slaves at the Congo River on 22 October. He also purchased slaves at Malemba (or Malembo), in the Kakongo kingdom, about 50 nautical miles north of the Congo River. Elliott left Africa 16 April 1793, and arrived at Kingston on 30 May 1793. She had embarked 475 slaves and she landed 472, for a loss rate of 0.6%. Elliot arrived back at Liverpool on 20 September. She had an initial crew of 44 men, of whom 13 died on the voyage.

Fifth slave voyage (1794-1795): War with France had commenced in 1793 and Sherwood acquired a letter of marque on 13 January 1794. He sailed from Liverpool on 27 February, bound for West Central Africa and St. Helena. He started purchasing slaves at Malemba on 23 June. Elliott left Africa on 28 October and arrived at Kingston on 20 December. She had embarked 505 slaves, and landed 500, for a loss rate of 1%. Elliott left Kingston on 26 February 1795, and arrived back at Liverpool on 20 April. She had an initial crew of 64 men, and suffered nine crew deaths on her voyage.

Sixth slave voyage (1795-1796): Sherwood sailed from Liverpool on 12 July 1795 and arrived at Havana in February 1796. He had embarked an estimated 543 slaves and he actually landed 497, for an estimated loss rate of 8.5%. She arrived back at Liverpool on 9 May 1795. Elliott had sailed with a crew of 49 men and had suffered two crew deaths on her voyage.

Seventh slave voyage (1796-1797): Captain David Christian acquired a letter of marque on 29 July 1796. Christian sailed from Liverpool 12 August 1796 bound for the Bight of Biafra. He purchased his slaves at Bonny and arrived at Kingston on 25 February 1797. He had embarked 495 slaves and he landed 473, for a loss rate of 4.4%. She left Kingston on 4 April 1797, and arrived back at Liverpool on 26 May. Elliott had one crew member die out of an initial crew of 57 men. Christian received a bounty of £100 for low slave mortality on the voyage.

Eighth slave voyage (1798-1799): Captain John Parkinson acquired a letter of marque on 21 March 1798. He sailed from Liverpool on 2 May, bound for West Central Africa and St. Helena. He delivered his slaves at Martinique on 2 January 1799. He had embarked an estimated 549 slaves and he actually landed 503, for an estimated loss rate of 8.4%. She left Martinique 24 January, and arrived back at Liverpool on 21 March. Elliott had an initial crew of 62 men, and lost seven.

Ninth slave voyage (1800-1802): Captain Timothy Boardman acquired a letter of marque on 7 June 1800. He sailed on 8 August 1800. It is not clear where he purchased his slaves, or exactly where in the British Caribbean he delivered them. She left her delivery port on 2 February 1802 and arrived at Liverpool on 21 April. Elliot had an initial crew of 50 men, and had 18 crew deaths.

Tenth slave voyage (1802-1804): Elliott had two masters on this voyage, A. Lawson and John Livingston. She sailed from Liverpool on 20 July 1802 bound for the Bight of Biafra. (Because she sailed during the Peace of Amiens, her captain did not acquire a letter of marque.) She purchased slaves at Bonny and arrived at Havana in March 1803. She had embarked an estimated 408 slaves and she actually landed 367, for an estimated loss rate of 10%. She arrived back at Liverpool on 12 July.

Whaler

Captain John Shuttleworth acquired a letter of marque on 29 September 1803. Shortly thereafter he sailed Elliot for Timor. Between 12 and 29 January 1806 she was at St Helena, having come from the South Seas. She returned to England on 22 March 1806. She was mentioned in the Protection Lists in 1803 and 1806.

Merchantman and capture
Captain Charles London acquired a letter of marque on 7 May 1807. Lloyd's Register for 1807 shows Elliot with London, master, Loudensk, owner, and trade London–Buenos Aires.

Elliott, of 16 guns and 18 men, and Juno, 10 guns and 27 men, resisted for an hour and a half before they struck. Elliot had one man killed, and two wounded, one of whom, the mate, later died of his wounds. The three French privateers were Jalouse, of seven guns and 80 men, Fripon, of five guns and 80 men, and Becune, of three guns and 45 men. The privateers took their prizes into Guadeloupe.

The Essequebo and Demerary Royal Gazette reported on 31 December 1807 that a cartel had arrived from Guadalupe with some passengers who had been captured on Elliot, Capt. London, and Juno, Capt. M'Murray. It noted that the two ships had sailed in company from Demerara about 15 October.

Lloyd's Register for 1809 has the notation "captured" under Elliotts name.

Notes

Citations

References
 
 
 
 
 

1783 ships
Liverpool slave ships
Whaling ships
Age of Sail merchant ships of England
Captured ships